Centronuclear myopathies (CNM) are a group of congenital myopathies where cell nuclei are abnormally located in the center of muscle cells instead of their normal location at the periphery.

Symptoms of CNM include severe hypotonia, hypoxia-requiring breathing assistance, and scaphocephaly. Among centronuclear myopathies, the X-linked myotubular myopathy form typically presents at birth, and is thus considered a congenital myopathy. However, some centronuclear myopathies may present later in life.

Presentation 
As with other myopathies, the clinical manifestations of MTM/CNM are most notably muscle weakness and associated disabilities. Congenital forms often present with neonatal low muscle tone, severe weakness, delayed developmental milestones (particularly gross motor milestones such as head control, crawling, and walking) and pulmonary complications (presumably due to weakness of the muscles responsible for respiration). Involvement of the facial muscles may cause ophthalmoplegia or ptosis.  A mutation in the RYR1 gene causing CNM may also cause susceptibility to malignant hyperthermia, a potentially life-threatening reaction to anesthesia.  While some patients with centronuclear myopathies remain ambulatory throughout their adult life, others may never crawl or walk and may require wheelchair use for mobility. There is substantial variability in the degree of functional impairment among the various centronuclear myopathies. Although this condition only affects the voluntary muscles, several children have had cardiac arrest, possibly due to the additional stress placed on the heart.

Other observed features have been high arched palate, long digits, bell shaped chest and long face. Myotubular myopathy only affects muscles and does not impact intelligence in any shape or form.

X-linked myotubular myopathy was traditionally a fatal condition of infancy, with life expectancy of usually less than two years. There appears to be substantial variability in the clinical severity for different genetic abnormalities at that same MTM1 gene. Further, published cases show significant differences in clinical severity among relatives with the same genetic abnormality at the MTM1 gene. Most truncating mutations of MTM1 cause a severe and early lethal phenotype, while some missense mutations are associated with milder forms and prolonged survival (up to 54 years).

Centronuclear myopathies typically have a milder presentation and a better prognosis. Autosomal dominant CNM tends to have a less severe phenotype than the autosomal recessive version.  Recently, researchers discovered mutations at the gene dynamin 2 (DNM2 on chromosome 19, at site 19p13.2), responsible for the autosomal dominant form of centronuclear myopathy. This condition is now known as dynamin 2 centronuclear myopathy (abbreviated DNM2-CNM). Research has indicated that patients with DNM2-CNM have a slowly progressive muscular weakness usually beginning in adolescence or early adulthood, with an age range of 12 to 74 years.

Genetic
The genetic abnormality associated with the X-linked form of myotubular myopathy (XLMTM) was first localized in 1990 to the X chromosome at site Xq28. MTM1 codes for the myotubularin protein, a highly conserved lipid phosphatase involved in cellular transport, trafficking and signalling. Approximately 80% of males with myotubular myopathy diagnosed by muscle biopsy have mutations in MTM1, and about 7% of these mutations are genetic deletions.

Centronuclear myopathies where the genetic abnormality is NOT sex-linked (e.g., not located on the X chromosome) are considered autosomal. Autosomal abnormalities can either be dominant or recessive, and are often referred to as AD for "autosomal dominant" or AR for "autosomal recessive").

Many researchers use the term "myotubular myopathy" (MTM) only for cases when the genetic test has come back positive for abnormalities (genetic mutations) at the MTM1 gene on the X chromosome. Cases with a centronuclear (nucleus in the center) appearance on muscle biopsy but a normal genetic test for MTM1 would be referred to as centronuclear myopathy until such time as a specific genetic site is identified to give a more detailed sub-classification.

The possible combinations of inheritance of myotubular myopathy are as follows:

Sporadic cases have also been reported where there is no previous family history (these cases are presumably due to a new mutation that was not present in either parent).

Pathology 
On examination of muscle biopsy material, the nuclear material is located predominantly in the center of the muscle cells, and is described as having any "myotubular" or "centronuclear" appearance. In terms of describing the muscle biopsy itself, "myotubular" or "centronuclear" are almost synonymous, and both terms point to the similar cellular-appearance among MTM and CNM. Thus, pathologists and treating physicians use those terms almost interchangeably, although researchers and clinicians are increasingly distinguishing between those phrases.

In general, a clinical myopathy and a muscle biopsy showing a centronuclear (nucleus in the center of the muscle cell) appearance would indicate a centronuclear myopathy (CNM). The most commonly diagnosed CNM is myotubular myopathy (MTM). However, muscle biopsy analysis alone cannot reliably distinguish myotubular myopathy from other forms of centronuclear myopathies, and thus genetic testing is required. Diagnostic workup is often coordinated by a treating neurologist. In the United States, care is often coordinated through clinics affiliated with the Muscular Dystrophy Association.

Diagnosis

Electrodiagnostic testing 
Electrodiagnostic testing (also called electrophysiologic) includes nerve conduction studies which involves stimulating a peripheral motor or sensory nerve and recording the response, and needle electromyography, where a thin needle or pin-like electrode is inserted into the muscle tissue to look for abnormal electrical activity.

Electrodiagnostic testing can help distinguish myopathies from neuropathies, which can help determine the course of further work-up. Most of the electrodiagnostic abnormalities seen in myopathies are also seen in neuropathies (nerve disorders). Electrodiagnostic abnormalities common to myopathies and neuropathies include; abnormal spontaneous activity (e.g., fibrillations, positive sharp waves, etc.) on needle EMG and, small amplitudes of the motor responses compound muscle action potential, or CMAP during nerve conduction studies. Many neuropathies, however, cause abnormalities of sensory nerve studies, whereas myopathies involve only the muscle, with normal sensory nerves. The most important factor distinguishing a myopathy from a neuropathy on needle EMG is the careful analysis of the motor unit action potential (MUAP) size, shape, and recruitment pattern.
There is substantial overlap between the electrodiagnostic findings the various types of myopathy. Thus, electrodiagnostic testing can help distinguish neuropathy from myopathy, but is not effective at distinguishing which specific myopathy is present, here muscle biopsy and perhaps subsequent genetic testing are required.

Treatment 
Currently there is no cure for myotubular or centronuclear myopathies. Treatment often focuses on trying to maximize functional abilities and minimize medical complications, and involvement by physicians specializing in Physical Medicine and Rehabilitation, and by physical therapists and occupational therapists.

Medical management generally involves efforts to prevent pulmonary complications, since lung infections can be fatal in patients lacking the muscle strength necessary to clear secretions via coughing. Medical devices to assist with coughing help patients maintain clear airways, avoiding mucous plugs and avoiding the need for tracheostomy tubes.

Monitoring for scoliosis is also important, since weakness of the trunk muscles can lead to deviations in spinal alignment, with resultant compromise of respiratory function. Many patients with congenital myopathies may eventually require surgical treatment of scoliosis.

Epidemiology 
The overall incidence of myotubular myopathy is 1 in 50,000 male live births. The incidence of other centronuclear myopathies is extremely rare, with there only being nineteen families identified with CNM throughout the world. The symptoms currently range from the majority who only need to walk with aids, from a stick to a walking frame, to total dependence on physical mobility aids such as wheelchairs and stand aids, but this latter variety is so rare that only two cases are known to the CNM "community".
Approximately 80% of males with a diagnosis of myotubular myopathy by muscle biopsy will have a mutation in MTM1 identifiable by genetic sequence analysis.

Many patients with myotubular myopathy die in infancy prior to receiving a formal diagnosis. When possible, muscle biopsy and genetic testing may still be helpful even after a neonatal death, since the diagnostic information can assist with family planning and genetic counseling as well as aiding in the accurate diagnosis of any relatives who might also have the same genetic abnormality.

History 
In 1966, Dr. Spiro (a New York City neurologist) published a medical report of a boy with myopathy, which upon muscle biopsy, showed that the nuclei of the muscle cells were located in the center of the muscle cells, instead of their normal location of the periphery.
The nuclear appearance reminded him of the nucleus-in-the-center appearance during the "myotubular" stage of embryonic development. Thus, he coined the term "myotubular myopathy". Spiro speculated that the embryonic muscle development he had seen in the boy was due to growth arrest during the myotubular phase, causing the myopathy.

More than three decades later, it is not fully understood whether this theory regarding halted (or delayed) embryonic muscle development is correct. Some research suggests that this theory may be acceptable for infant-onset myotubular myopathy (mutations at the MTM1 gene on the X chromosome) but may not be acceptable for the autosomal forms of centronuclear myopathy, while other research suggests that the growth arrest mechanism may be responsible for all forms of MTM and CNM.
Regardless of whether the myopathy is caused by arrest at the "myotubular" stage, for historical reasons the name myotubular myopathy persists and is widely accepted.

As a reference to the term myotubular myopathy (MTM), when a genetic abnormality on the X chromosome was determined to be involved in a substantial percentage of individuals with the myotubular/centronuclear appearance on muscle biopsy, researchers named the gene segment MTM1. Similarly, the protein typically produced by that gene is called "myotubularin".

Advocacy 
There are several global advocacy groups working closely to educate newly affected families on care guidelines. The Joshua Frase Foundation is a comprehensive resource for care guidelines for Centronuclear myopathies. In the United States, children with congenital myopathies often receive therapy services through Early Intervention Programs (EIP, providing services from birth to 3 years old) administered by the state of residence. After the child is 3 years old, Special Education services are provided under the federal Individuals with Disabilities Education Act (IDEA, with myopathies being eligible when classified under conditions causing muscular weakness). IDEA is meant to protect the rights of every disabled student to receive a free and appropriate public education (FAPE) in the least restrictive environment (ideally meaning integrated with non-disabled classmates).

Centronuclear myopathies involve pathology at the skeletal muscles, generally without brain involvement or cognitive deficits. Even so, the motor deficits (weakness and associated impairments) may impede in individual's ability to access the educational curriculum (e.g., difficulties lifting or carrying books, difficulties grasping a writing instrument, endurance difficulties throughout the school day, etc.). Further, recurrent respiratory infections may result in missed school days.

Terminology
Although all forms of centronuclear myopathy are considered rare, the most commonly known form of CNM is Myotubular Myopathy (MTM). (The terms "centronuclear myopathy" and "myotubular myopathy" are sometimes equated.)

Literally, a myopathy is a disease of the muscle tissue itself. Myo derives from the word muscle and pathos means disease. There are dozens of different myopathies, and myopathies are not the only conditions that can cause muscle weakness. Other diseases can cause weakness such as medical conditions affecting sites outside of the muscle itself, including problems in the brain (such as stroke, cerebral palsy, multiple sclerosis), or problems in the spinal cord and/or nerve (such as polio and spinal muscular atrophy).

References

External links 
 GeneReviews/NCBI/NIH/UW entry on X-Linked Myotubular Myopathy or Centronuclear Myopathy

Myoneural junction and neuromuscular diseases